Bank of Guam Crushers
Bentley United
Carpet Masters
Guam Shipyard
KFC Soccer Club
NO KA OI
Paintco Strykers
Quality Distributors
Big Blue
Crushers
DeYo
Fuji Ichiban Espada
Han Ma Um
Hyundai/Family
Islanders
Paintco Strykers II
Rovers
Toyota 4Runners
Younex/Sheraton

Guam
 

Football clubs